Parvoscincus duwendorum, also known as the cordillera aquatic skink,  is a species of skink endemic to the island Luzon, the Philippines.

References

Parvoscincus
Reptiles of the Philippines
Endemic fauna of the Philippines
Fauna of Luzon
Reptiles described in 2014
Taxa named by Cameron D. Siler
Taxa named by Charles W. Linkem
Taxa named by Kerry Cobb
Taxa named by Jessa L. Watters
Taxa named by Sean T. Cummings
Taxa named by Arvin Cantor Diesmos
Taxa named by Rafe M. Brown